Mundlauga Crags is a group of  high rock crags that form the south end of Fenriskjeften Mountain in the Drygalski Mountains, Queen Maud Land in Antarctica. They were mapped from surveys and air photos by the Norwegian Antarctic Expedition (1956–60) and named Mundlauga.

Cliffs of Queen Maud Land
Princess Astrid Coast